Late Thakur Prasad was an eminent lawyer of Patna High Court, Bihar. He was one of the founding member of Bharatiya Jana Sangh  and was its state president for 10 years. He also held the Industry portfolio in the state cabinet of Bihar and was a cabinet minister in Karpoori Thakur ministry in 1977.

Early life and education 
He was the father of Ravi Shankar Prasad, the current Law Minister of India and Anuradha Prasad, editor in chief of News 24 (India).

Law career 
He was a senior advocate at Patna High Court.

Political career 
Thakur prasad was a member of  Bihar Legislative Assembly from Patna West Assembly constituency from 1977 to 1980.

References

Politicians from Patna
State cabinet ministers of Bihar
20th-century Indian lawyers
Bharatiya Jana Sangh politicians
Year of death missing
Bihar MLAs 1977–1980
Bharatiya Janata Party politicians from Bihar
Janata Party politicians